Valeska Stock (1887–1966) was a German actress who appeared in around thirty films in supporting roles. Stock originally trained as a ballet dancer in her native Breslau, before moving into theatre and then into the film industry. She played the wife of Paul Wegener's Fabrikant Dreißiger in the 1927 film The Weavers. Her final appearance was a small role in the 1949 East German production Rotation.

Partial filmography

 Der Bekannte Unbekannte (1922) - Magd
 Semi-Silk (1925) - Frau Weber
 Upstairs and Downstairs (1925) - Frau Brenneis
 The Mill at Sanssouci (1926) - seine Frau
 Cab No. 13 (1926) - Mme Coco
 Der Prinz und die Tänzerin (1926)
 The Captain from Koepenick (1926)
 The Prince and the Dancer (1926)
 Poor Little Colombine (1927) - Frau Rabe
 Der Sieg der Jugend (1927) - Jesus Kümmelbackes Frau
 The Weavers (1927) - Frau Dreißiger
 Männer vor der Ehe (1927) - Ihre Mutter, Vermieterin
 The Trial of Donald Westhof (1927)
 Mädchenschicksale (1928) - Die Hebamme
 The Abduction of the Sabine Women (1928) - Frau Professor Gollwitz
 You Walk So Softly (1928) - Mutter Krause
 Miss Midshipman (1929) - Frau Kapitän Strupps
  (1930) - Witwe Bollmann
 Dolly Gets Ahead (1930)
 Die lustigen Musikanten (1930) - Frau Selbinger
 Sein Scheidungsgrund (1931)
 Die Koffer des Herrn O.F. (1931)
 You Don't Forget Such a Girl (1932) - Angebe Nebenrolle
 Love Conquers All (1934)
 Artist Love (1935) - Frau Memminger
 The Castle in Flanders (1936) - (uncredited)
 The Muzzle (1938) - Schmitz` Frau
 Five Million Look for an Heir (1938) - Hausbewohnerin (uncredited)
 Schwarzfahrt ins Glück (1938) - Frau Powileit
 Ich verweigere die Aussage (1939) - Frau Stanecke
 Fritze Bollmann wollte angeln (1943) - Gemüsefrau
 Rotation (1949) - Hebamme (final film role)

References

Bibliography
 Eisner, Lotte H. The Haunted Screen: Expressionism in the German Cinema and the Influence of Max Reinhardt. University of California Press, 2008.

External links

1887 births
1966 deaths
German silent film actresses
German film actresses
German stage actresses
Actors from Wrocław
People from the Province of Silesia
20th-century German actresses